The 7th Abia State House of Assembly was Inaugurated on Monday 10 June 2019 after a Proclamation by the Abia State Governor Dr. Okezie Victor Ikpeazu. Formed after the Governorship and State House of Assembly Elections of Saturday 9 March 2019 and inaugurated on Monday 10 June 2019, the Representatives of the Assembly were elected from 24 constituencies with the majority being members of the People's Democratic Party. The elected Speaker is Chinedum Enyinnaya Orji representing Umuahia Central State Constituency.

Leadership

Members

References

Abia State House of Assembly